WTIX may refer to:

WTIX-FM, a radio station (94.3 FM) licensed to Galliano, Louisiana, United States
WEGO (AM), a radio station (1410 AM) licensed to Concord, North Carolina, which held the call sign WTIX from 2009 to 2018
WTOB (AM), a radio station (980 AM) licensed to Winston-Salem, North Carolina, United States, which used the call letters WTIX from 2006 to 2009
WQNO, a radio station (690 AM) licensed to New Orleans, Louisiana, United States, which used the call sign WTIX from 1953 to 2005